The Methodist Church, St Martin's, Isles of Scilly is a Grade II listed chapel in St Martin's, Isles of Scilly.

History
Bible Christians arrived in St Martin's in the 1820s and built a simple thatched chapel around 1821. This was replaced in 1836 by the current building. In 1876 the chapel was reseated and in 1881 a Sunday School hall was added. In 1907, the Bible Christian Church in England was amalgamated with the United Methodist Free Churches and the Methodist New Connexion, to form the United Methodist Church.

The church is now part of the Isles of Scilly Methodist Circuit.

See also

St Mary's Methodist Church, Isles of Scilly

References

Churches completed in 1836
Methodist churches in Cornwall
Churches in the Isles of Scilly
Grade II listed buildings in Cornwall
St Martin's, Isles of Scilly